This is a list of events that occurred in the year 1523 in Norway.

Incumbents
Monarch: Christian II then Frederick I

Events
 20 January – Christian II is deposed as King of Norway.
 31 January – Swedish forces occupy Ranrike.
 1 July – Olav Torkelsson becomes Bishop of Bergen.
 November:
 8–9 November – Hansa merchants expels all Scots from Bergen.
 Swedish War of Liberation ends. This marks the end for the Kalmar Union.
 Supporters of Christian II surrendered Akershus Fortress and Bergenhus Fortress to the Norwegian National Council.
 December – Olav Engelbrektsson becomes the Archbishop of Norway.

Deaths
Nils Henriksson, knight, land owner (born c. 1455).

References